Pan Wei-chih (born 13 July 1982) is a Taiwanese football (soccer) goalkeeper. He succeeded Yang Cheng-hsing to become Taiwan Power Company F.C.'s goalkeeper. He has been called up to the Chinese Taipei national football team. He is also the first-choice goalkeeper in the Chinese Taipei national futsal team.

Career statistics

References

1982 births
Living people
Futsal goalkeepers
Taiwan Power Company F.C. players
Taiwanese footballers
Taiwanese men's futsal players
Fu Jen Catholic University alumni
Association football goalkeepers